The plus-one system, also known as a 4-team playoff, is the system used to determine the National Champion in the Football Bowl Subdivision (formerly called Division I-A) of NCAA football in the United States. The format is of a 4-team playoff, where two bowl games act as semi-final games, and the winners of these games participate in the National Championship Game. 

It features one more game than the previous Bowl Championship Series (BCS) system, which was used through the end of the 2013 season. The BCS used a formula based on polls and computer rankings to assign teams to bowl games, with the teams that were ranked #1 and #2 nationally placed into the BCS National Championship Game. The BCS system was divisive. Opponents of the system argued that it was unfair to automatically assign teams to the National Championship, because it was impossible to determine the two top teams without some form of a playoff. BCS supporters argued that a playoff would minimize the importance of the regular season and would lessen the intensity of rivalry games, a staple of college sports, and that a playoff would be too time-consuming for student athletes who have scholastic obligations in addition to their athletic commitment.

When proposed, the Plus-One system had supporters and detractors, but gained momentum during the 2011 offseason. The system first took effect at the conclusion of the 2014 season during the first College Football Playoff.

Background
Created before the 1998 season, the BCS was intended to be an improvement over the previous postseason system because it would eliminate any doubt over which team deserved to be #1. Prior to the BCS, there was no official national championship game; instead, the coaches and writers constructed the final AP poll and Coaches Poll at the end of the season, and the #1 ranked team would be declared the National Champion. This often resulted in multiple teams tying for the championship.

Beginning in 1998, four bowl games were declared to be BCS bowls: the Rose Bowl, the Orange Bowl, the Sugar Bowl, and the Fiesta Bowl. Six of the eight available slots for these games were filled by the winners of the Automatic-Qualifying conferences: the Big Ten, the Big East, the Pac-12, the Southeastern Conference, the Big 12, and the Atlantic Coast Conference. There was also a clause that allowed Notre Dame, which does not belong to a conference, to play in a BCS game if they were ranked at least eighth nationally at the end of the regular season. From the 1998 season through the 2005 season, the National Championship game rotated among the four BCS bowls. Starting with the 2006 season, a fifth BCS bowl, the BCS National Championship, was added.

College Football Playoff

The College Football Playoff (CFP) system was announced in June 2012 and scheduled to replace the BCS system beginning with the 2014 season, using a variation of the Plus-One system to determine a national champion for the NCAA Division I Football Bowl Subdivision (FBS). The playoffs consist of four teams that play in two semifinal games, with the winners advancing to the College Football Playoff National Championship. The system will continue through at least the 2025 season, by a contract with ESPN, which owns the rights to broadcast all games in the playoffs.

Plus-One
The Plus-One system gained support because, unlike many other proposed formats, it did not significantly extend the season for players and coaches. Under the system, the top four teams in the country are assigned to a playoff. The teams are seeded 1-4; the 1 seed plays the 4 seed and the 2 seed plays the 3 seed. The winners advance to the national title game; the overall postseason remains largely the same, save for the extra game, hence the name “Plus-One.”

One of the biggest problems that was to be resolved was where to play the games. The goal is to minimize travel without hurting the massive revenues that these games produce. Some believed that the higher-seeded teams should host the first round of the playoff, and that the final should be played either at a neutral site or at the highest remaining seed’s home stadium. This would reduce travel for the higher seed, and could also add meaning to the regular season; teams that did well in the regular season would earn higher seeds and have a distinct advantage playing at home. However, this would have been detrimental to Bowls’ host cities, which benefit from the tourism that bowl games create. Another proposed solution was for cities to bid for a chance to host a playoff game, similar to how the Super Bowl location is determined. This would have neutralized any site advantage of the higher-seeded team, making the game more fair but lessening the importance of the regular season. 
A major benefit of the Plus-One system is increased revenues. After consulting several industry sources, CBSSports.com concluded that a Plus-One system could generate between $250 million and $500 million, well in excess of the $180 million generated by the BCS in 2011. This analysis was proven true with the massive television-rights contract for the new College Football Playoff. The first College Football Playoff semifinals and national championship were the three most-viewed programs in cable television history.

There have been many supporters for the Plus-One system, largely because it increased the number of teams who had a chance for the title game. Although there is still a debate over which teams deserved to make the playoff, the debate is lessened because teams are now vying for four playoff spots instead of two.

Opponents of the Plus One system argued that the NCAA was only considering the system because it would bring in more money, and that it would inevitably evolve into an 8, 12, or 16-team playoff. They also said that such a format would detract from the rich history of games such as the Rose Bowl.

References

NCAA Division I FBS football
Bowl Championship Series
College football controversies
Tournament systems